Betty Toons is a Colombian animated television series was produced by RCN Televisión in 2002, based on Fernando Gaitán's soap opera Yo soy Betty, la fea, retrofitting all the characters to make them children living in a primary school. After the great success of the transmission of this telenovela in 1999 until 2001, the idea of the production of the animated series by RCN Televisión came about. The series lasted a year on the air.

The voice direction was done by Hernán Zajec and Maribel Echeverría. The musical direction was by Juancho Pulido and the logistics were in charge with Paula Arenas.

In the United States, Betty Toons aired on Telefutura from 2004–2008 in Spanish.

The cartoon version recreates the era of the protagonists in childhood, when everyone attends the same school, including Beatriz Pinzón or Betty, Armando Mendoza, "La Peliteñida", Marcela Valencia, the teacher Gutierrez, who sometimes uses English words when he is talking.

This is the first time that a Colombian animated series is aired on Cartoon Network and Boomerang
in Latin America, on November 7, 2004 and ended on December 17, 2006.

In Mexico the series was shown by Canal de las Estrellas in 2004 and 2005.

The series was redisplayed on February 17, 2018 and January 6, 2019 again by RCN, was also shown Tacho Pistacho channel.

Plot
One day a girl dressed as Betty goes to school who gets made fun of for her looks, The series is very similar to the original telenovela but they go to school and Armando does not work at EcoModa yet. Hugo Lombardi is not a character in this version. Most characters from Yo Soy Betty la fea are in Betty Toons but there are also new characters, like the teacher Professor Gutierrez. The series ends with Betty being an exchange student and moves to France, in the airplane she meets a new boy

Voice cast and characters 
 Alejandra Botero as Beatriz "Betty" Aurora Pinzón Solano.
 Andrés López as Nicolas Mora; Daniel Valencia; Freddy
 Alberto León Jaramillo as Professor Gutiérrez
 Juan Gaviria as Armando Mendoza Sáenz
 Marcela Jimenez as Marcela Valencia
 Juliana Botero as Patricia Fernández
 Marta Noriega as Mario Calderón
 Luz Amparo Álvarez as Aura María Fuentes; Sofía López
 Martha Araujo as Bertha Muñoz; Julia Solano de Pinzón
 José Ordóñez as Hermes Pinzón
 Martha Ginneth Rincón as Sandra Patiño
 Giovanna Bernal as Mariana Valdés
 María Mercedes Murillo as Doña Nicolasa

References

External links
 

Yo soy Betty, la fea
2002 Colombian television series debuts
2003 Colombian television series endings
2000s Colombian television series
Colombian children's animated comedy television series
RCN Televisión original programming
Animated television series about children
Spanish-language television shows